Ahmed Mohamed Ahmed also known as Ahmed Gaab (Arabic: أحمد محمد أحمد; born 22 February 1980) is a Somali football coach and former player.

Coaching career
After starting at a very young age on several positions in Somali Football Federation's observation department under the guidance of then-Federation President Abdegani Saeed Arab, who hired him because of his coaching knowledge of football, he then became head coach of the Somalia national beach soccer team and technical adviser of the Federation. He achieved his professional coaching licence as first Swiss-Somali born coach in Germany. He previously managed the Somalia national beach soccer team FC Wyler Bern Youth A Team and BSC Young Boys Youth team in Berne Switzerland.

In February 2015, he was appointed as the head coach of the U.S. Virgin Islands national football team.

In March 2017, he was appointed as the coach of the Barbadian national team.

References

1980 births
Living people
Somalian footballers
Somalian football managers
Somalian expatriate sportspeople in Switzerland
Expatriate soccer managers in the United States Virgin Islands
Expatriate footballers in Switzerland
FC Thun players
Somalia international footballers
Association football defenders
Expatriate footballers in Barbados
Somalian expatriate football managers
Somalian expatriate sportspeople in Barbados
Somalian expatriate sportspeople in the United States Virgin Islands